is a Japanese footballer currently playing as a midfielder for YSCC Yokohama.

Career statistics

Club
.

Notes

References

External links

1998 births
Living people
Association football people from Kanagawa Prefecture
Japanese footballers
Association football midfielders
J3 League players
YSCC Yokohama players